Muhammad Habibur Rahman (3 December 1928 – 11 January 2014) was a Chief Justice of Bangladesh Supreme Court in 1995. He was the Chief Adviser of the 1996 caretaker government which oversaw the Seventh parliamentary elections in Bangladesh. He was a faculty member at the Department of Law, University of Rajshahi and University of Dhaka. Besides, being a language activist, advocate of the Bengali language, he wrote extensively and published eight books on the subject. He played a significant role to implement Bengali in the Supreme Court of Bangladesh. He wrote Jathashabdo (1974), the first thesaurus in the Bengali language.

Rahman was awarded Bangla Academy Literary Award in 1984 and Ekushey Padak in 2007 by the Government of Bangladesh. He served as a Fellow of Bangla Academy, Asiatic Society of Bangladesh and Worcester College, Oxford.

Education
Rahman was educated in Kolkata, Dhaka, Oxford and London. He attended the University of Dhaka and was an activist in the Bengali Language Movement.

Career
Rahman began his career as a lecturer in history of Dhaka University in 1952. Later he joined Department of Law, University of Rajshahi where he subsequently held the office of Dean of the Faculty of Law (1961) and of Reader in History (1962–64). He changed his profession in 1964 when he took to law and joined the Dhaka High Court Bar. In his legal career, he held the offices of Assistant Advocate General (1969), Vice President of High Court Bar Association (1972) and member of Bangladesh bar council(1972).

Literature
Rahman was an author of seventy books in Bengali on law, language, literature, poetry and religion and five books in English, including two books of verse.  Law of Requisition (1966), Rabindra Prabandhey Sanjna O Parthakya Bichar (1968), Jatha-sabda (1974), Matri-bhashar Sapakshey Rabindranath (1983), Qur'an-sutra (1984), Bachan O Prabachan (1985), Gangariddhi thekey Bangladesh (1985), Rabindra Rachanar Rabindra-byaksha (1986), Rabindra-kabyey Art, Sangeet O Sahitya (1986), Koran-shorif Sorol Banganubad, On Rights and Remedies, Amara ki Jabo-na Tader Kachhey Jara Shudhu Banglai Katha Baley (1996).

Legacy
Rahman made notable contributions to the Language Movement, 21 February 1952 of the then East Pakistan. He was the first person to break the Section 144 lead the first batch of a procession and was arrested soon after that. On that day, the police and parliamentary forces resorted to widespread tear gas shelling, clubbing and finally shooting. Consequently, several students were killed, hundreds were injured and thousands were arrested.

Death
On 11 January 2014, at the age of 85, Rahman died at United Hospital, Gulshan, Dhaka.

References

1928 births
2014 deaths
Supreme Court of Bangladesh justices
University of Dhaka alumni
University of Rajshahi alumni
Recipients of the Ekushey Padak
Recipients of Bangla Academy Award
Chief justices of Bangladesh